Gold Strike is a Dutch cinnamon liqueur containing gold snippets, produced by Lucas Bols. The company suggests it should be drunk as a shot, with the motto "Shake, Shoot and Strike". It is a clear liquid that tastes like cinnamon candy.

Though the company website states the gold flakes are "24-carat", some bottles indicate that the gold has various other levels of purity, such as 22 K or 23.5 K. The gold flakes present little health risk.  A common urban legend about Gold Strike is that the gold flakes cut the throat or stomach upon ingestion, allowing the alcohol to directly enter the bloodstream for quicker intoxication.

Similar products
Other alcoholic beverages that contain gold are Goldschläger and Goldwasser. Cinnamon liqueurs include Fireball Cinnamon Whisky.

References

Shooters (drinks)